Otto Seidl (11 December 1931 – 10 December 2022) was a German judge. He served as Vice-President of the Federal Constitutional Court from 1995 to 1998.

Seidl died on 10 December 2022, at the age of 80.

References

1941 births
2022 deaths
20th-century German judges
Justices of the Federal Constitutional Court
Ludwig Maximilian University of Munich alumni
Grand Crosses with Star and Sash of the Order of Merit of the Federal Republic of Germany
Jurists from Bavaria
People from Munich